The Uncanny or Uncanny may refer to:

 Uncanny, a Freudian concept
 The Uncanny, a 1919 essay by Sigmund Freud
 The Uncanny (film), a 1977 film
 Uncanny (film), a 2015 American science fiction film
 Uncanny (short story collection), a 1988 book by Paul Jennings
 Uncanny Magazine, an online magazine of fantasy and science fiction
 Uncanny, a BBC Sounds podcast and BBC 2 TV show in the UK hosted by Danny Robins